Ariel Dieguez and Ariel Medeiro are fashion bloggers, photographers, and stylists who are best known by the moniker Los Arys. The duo received the 2016 Influence Award from MTV and Los 40 Principales.
 
Los Arys was formed by Argentinian's Ariel Dieguez and Ariel Medeiro. In 2011, the two combined their social media popularity to promote their work real-time on Facebook and through the website LosArys.com. Los Arys grew into an influencer platform where Dieguez and Medeiro blogged about food, clothes, and placed they visited. They two became brand ambassadors for Christian Louboutin.

References

External links
 Los Arys official website

Date of birth missing (living people)
Living people
2011 establishments in Argentina
Argentine bloggers
Year of birth missing (living people)